Ignacio Awad García Justiniano (born August 20, 1986) is a Bolivian football defender who currently plays for Real Potosí.

Club career
Born in Santa Cruz de la Sierra, Ignacio is the younger brother of Aris Thessaloniki F.C. and the Bolivia national team midfielder Ronald "Nacho" García.

The Tahuichi Academy is where he developed his football skills as a youngster. Then in 2004, he reached professional level with club Bolívar where he played for a couple of seasons, mainly as a substitute. In 2006, he was loaned to Blooming, but he didn't get much playing time, so he returned to Bolívar the following year. During his second spell with la academia, he began to show more confidence and his playing capacity improved considerably; earning a spot in the starting line-up indisputably. In 2011, he was signed by Blooming for the second time in his career.

International career
Since 2008, García has earned 11 caps with the Bolivia national team. He represented his country in 7 FIFA World Cup qualification matches.

Honours

References

External links
 
 
 

1986 births
Living people
Sportspeople from Santa Cruz de la Sierra
Bolivian footballers
Bolivia international footballers
Association football defenders
Club Bolívar players
Club Blooming players
Club Aurora players
Club San José players
C.D. Jorge Wilstermann players
Nacional Potosí players
Oriente Petrolero players